The Bournemouth Blitz was the heavy bombing of Bournemouth, Hampshire (but now in Dorset), England from 1940 to 1944, by the Nazi German Luftwaffe during the Second World War.More than 2,200 bombs fell on Bournemouth and Poole during World War II, and 350 civilians and servicemen were killed.

Events

1940 
Robert Louis Stevenson's house Skerryvore, at the head of Alum Chine, was severely damaged by bombs during a destructive and lethal raid on the night of 15–16 November 1940. Despite a campaign to save it, the building was demolished.

1941 
On 27 March 1941, a lone German bomber hit the canteen at the Bourne Valley gasworks killing 33 people. This was the deadliest air raid that Poole suffered.

1943 

The biggest air raid was on 23 May 1943 in which many Focke Wolf 190 planes dropped 25 bombs on the town.

The buildings targeted that day included the Central Hotel at Richmond Hill; the Shamrock and Rambler coach station at Holdenhurst Road and Beales department store. The Methodist Church on Exeter Road was destroyed and 77 people were killed. 

The biggest loss was the Metropole Hotel in Lansdowne, where many Allied servicemen were staying. 22 Commonwealth airmen (mostly Canadian and Australian), and approximately 110 civilians were killed. The hotel was demolished in 1955. 

Across Bournemouth Town Centre twenty-two buildings were destroyed and 3,354 were damaged.

Legacy 

In 2013, a memorial was unveiled on the 70th anniversary of the last air raid.

References 

History of Bournemouth
The Blitz
1940s in England
History of Dorset
Bournemouth
20th century in Hampshire
20th century in Dorset